Major-General Cecil Llewellyn Firbank,  (1903–1985) was a British Army officer.

Military career
Born in Oakhill, Mendip District, Somerset, Firbank entered the Royal Military College, Sandhurst, and was commissioned into the Somerset Light Infantry on 30 January 1924. Eric Bols and Robert King were among his fellow graduates, both also future major-generals.

During the Second World War, he commanded the 2nd Battalion, the Lincolnshire Regiment in North West Europe in 1944 and then commanded the 71st Infantry Brigade also in North West Europe from April 1945 during the Second World War for which he was appointed a Companion of the Distinguished Service Order & Bar.

After the war he became Commandant, School of Infantry in September 1948, General Officer Commanding 43rd (Wessex) Infantry Division in September 1951 and Director of Infantry in October 1955 before retiring in December 1958 .

He was appointed a Commander of the Order of the British Empire in the 1951 Birthday Honours and a Companion of the Order of the Bath in the 1953 Coronation Honours.

He was honorary colonel of the Somerset and Cornwall Light Infantry from 1963 to 1968.

References

External links
Generals of World War II

1903 births
1985 deaths
British Army major generals
Companions of the Order of the Bath
Commanders of the Order of the British Empire
Companions of the Distinguished Service Order
Somerset Light Infantry officers
British Army brigadiers of World War II
Graduates of the Royal Military College, Sandhurst
People from Mendip District
Military personnel from Somerset